Monophylla terminata is a species of checkered beetle in the family Cleridae. It is found in Australia, Europe and Northern Asia (excluding China), Central America, and North America.

References

Further reading

 
 

Tillinae
Articles created by Qbugbot
Beetles described in 1835